Köping Municipality is a municipality in Västmanland County in central Sweden. Its seat is located in the city of Köping.

The municipality was created in 1971, when the former City of Köping was merged with the municipalities of Kolsva, Medåker and Munktorp forming a new municipality of unitary type.

Localities 
 Kolsva
 Munktorp
 Köping (seat)

Riksdag elections

See also 
Köping (concept)

References

External links

Köping Municipality – Official site
Article Köping - From Nordisk familjebok

Municipalities of Västmanland County